Bastidiens may refer to:
La Bastide-de-Lordat inhabitants
La Bastide-de-Sérou inhabitants
La Bastide-sur-l'Hers inhabitants